is a passenger railway station in the city of Funabashi, Chiba Prefecture, Japan, operated by the private railway operator Keisei Electric Railway.

Lines
Kaijin Station is served by the Keisei Main Line, and is located 23.6 km from the terminus of the line at Keisei Ueno Station.

Station layout
Kaijin Station has two opposed side platforms connected via a footbridge to a station building. The platforms are short, and can only accommodate trains with a length of six carriages or less.

Platforms

History
Kaijin Station was opened on 25 October 1919. In December 1929 the Sobu Railway Noda Line (currently Tōbu Noda Line) connected to Kaijin Station, but operations were discontinued in 1934.

Station numbering was introduced to all Keisei Line stations on 17 July 2010. Kaijin was assigned station number KS21.

Passenger statistics
In fiscal 2019, the station was used by an average of 5715 passengers daily.

Surrounding area
Hinodai Shell Midden Museum
Funabashi City Kaijin Junior High School
Funabashi City Nishikaijin Elementary School

See also
 List of railway stations in Japan

References

External links

  

Railway stations in Japan opened in 1919
Railway stations in Chiba Prefecture
Keisei Main Line
Funabashi